Gaurav Bidhuri (born 16 May 1993) is an Indian boxer from Mandanpur Khadar village, New Delhi who competes in the 56 kg bantamweight division. He is ranked 11th in the World by AIBA in the year 2018. He won a bronze medal at the 2017 World Boxing Championships held at Hamburg, Germany. He is the only 4th Indian boxer who got a medal at World Boxing Championship. He is currently employed with Indian Railways.

World Championship 2017

Gaurav Bidhuri got a wild-card entry for his debut 2017 World Championship under the Bantamweight category. After winning the quarterfinal bout against Tunisian boxer Bilel Mhamdi, he was guaranteed a medal at the competition.

Early life

Gaurav started his boxing career when he was 11 years old at his father's Boxing club. His father, Dharmender Bidhuri is his first coach who himself is a National Level Boxer. It was his father's dream to represent the country in Olympics and win a medal, but due to family issues, he could not continue his boxing career. His love of boxing could not keep him away from the sport, so he started his own boxing club, where he trains the locals free of cost. Gaurav aims to complete his father's dream to represent the country in Olympics and get a medal for the nation. Gaurav completed his schooling from The Frank Anthony Public School and completed his graduation from Kirori Mal College, Delhi University.

Boxing career 

2004-2007

Gaurav won the gold medal in the Delhi State Sub Junior Boxing Championship for 5 consecutive years since 2004. In the year 2005, he was also awarded the Best Boxer in the championship.

In 2005, he won a gold medal at the 21st Sub Junior National Boxing Championship held in Noida. In the following year, he won a silver medal at the 22nd Sub Junior Boxing Championship in Jamshedpur. He won a gold medal in the 2007 School National Championship in Punjab along with the title of Best Boxer.

2008-2010

In 2008 he again won two gold medals. One at the 23rd Sub Junior National Boxing Championship held in Galanhad, Assam, and the other in School National Games held in Shimla. He also participated in the Children of Asia Games in Russia. In the 2009 School National championship, he won a silver medal. He was a quarter-finalist in the 2009 AIBA World Junior Boxing Championship held in Yerevan, Armenia. He won a bronze medal in the 2010 Youth School National Championship.

2011-2012

In 2011, Gaurav won a bronze medal at the 21st Presidents Cup held in Jakarta. He bagged a gold medal besides the title of Best Boxer at the 2011 All-India University Boxing Championship taken place in Udaipur. In the same year, he was part of the Mumbai Fighters in the World Series of Boxing and won the match against the Dynamo Moscow. He won a silver medal in the 2012 59th Senior Men's National Boxing Championship in Hyderabad.

2013

The boxer was selected for training cum World Boxing Championship in Kazakhstan. He came in at the second position for the World Championship selection trials. He attended the national camp in the month of May.

2014

Gaurav was a quarter-finalist in the 17th Asian Games held in Incheon, South Korea.

2015

Gaurav captured the silver medal in the Qatar International Boxing Championship. He was part of a training cum competition in China where he defeated the World Number 3 boxer of the year. He was selected by the Italia Thunder for the World Series of Boxing for the session 2014-2015 and 2015–2016.  He won three consecutive matches for his team in the tournament. He had a clear victory against Caciques Venezuela's Orlando David Pinosilva

In the two matches held in April, he crushed his opponents Zhakupov Kiras of Astana Arians Kazakhstan and Kozlowski Grzegorz of Rafako Hussars Polland.  Earlier in the match held in the month of March, he had lost the match against Azerbaijan Baku Fires' Murad Rabadanov. He also lost the match against USA Knockouts’ Venegas Brent Richard held in June.

2016

Gaurav participated in the World Olympic qualifier held in Azerbaijan. In July, Gaurav reached the quarter-finals of the WSB/APB qualifier at Vargas, Venezuela. He was selected for the World Series of Boxing by USA Knockout for the season 2016 to 2017 but he lost the WSB fight against the British Lionhearts.

2017

Gaurav Bidhuri claimed the bronze medal at the AIBA World Boxing Championship held in Hamburg, Germany. He won a gold medal in the 44th Grand Prix held in the month of July in Prague, Czech Republic. He reached the quarter-finals of the Asian Boxing Championship in Tashkent, Uzbekistan.

2018

At the Umakhanov Memorial Tournament in Kapiysk, Russia, he won a bronze medal. He also won a silver medal at the National Boxing Championship held in Pune.

2019

Gaurav played for the Bengaluru Brawler in the Big Bout League. He won a silver medal at the Indian Railway Championship held in the month of September. The boxer also won a silver medal at the Presidents Cup in Indonesia. He participated in the Round Robin Cup which took place in Germany. He was also a participant in the Strandhza Cup held in Bulgaria.

Awards and achievements 
Gaurav Bidhuri is the 4th Indian Boxer in the history of boxing who has won a medal at the World Boxing Championship. He is the 2nd Indian ever to grab a medal at the debut match of World Boxing Championship. Gaurav is the 1st Indian boxer till now who has signed two successive contracts in the World Series Boxing (for the Italian team in 2015 and the USA team in 2016). He is the first and only wild card player to get a medal at the World Boxing Championship.

Gaurav was nominated for the Arjuna Award, one of the highest-ranked sports, for three consecutive years, 2018, 2019, and 2020.

The Times of India awarded him with The Best Boxer Award in the year 2017.

Social media 
The Indian boxer uses social media to share his daily life, practice sessions and workout videos with his fans. He has 25.9K followers on his Instagram and 1358 followers on his Twitter. Apart from these two social media platforms he also uses Facebook to share his life moments with his fans.

References

http://timesofindia.indiatimes.com/sports/boxing/world-boxing-championship-gaurav-bidhuri-assures-india-a-medal/articleshow/60279535.cms
 https://sports.ndtv.com/boxing/boxer-gaurav-bidhuri-happy-to-live-fathers-dream-of-world-championships-
 1745812https://www.google.co.in/amp/s/sportstar.thehindu.com/boxing/three-indian-boxers-in-top-10-of-aiba-rankings-bidhuri-reaches-career-high-11th-spot/article19770809.ece/amp/
 https://www.google.co.in/amp/s/www.indiatoday.in/amp/sports/other-sports/story/amit-panghal-gaurav-bidhuri-nomiated-arjuna-award-1513668-2019-04-30
 https://www.google.co.in/amp/s/m.timesofindia.com/mahindra-scorpio-toisa-gaurav-bidhuri-wins-boxer-of-the-year-award/amp_articleshow/63079364.cms
 https://www.india.com/video-gallery/gaurav-bidhuri-on-tokyo-olympics-sushil-kumars-chhatrasal-case-delhi-government-and-future-plans-4698951/ 
 https://www.india.com/sports/bfi-how-arvind-kejriwal-led-delhi-government-failed-world-boxing-championship-medalist-gaurav-bidhuri-4084378/
 https://www.india.com/sports/bfi-how-arvind-kejriwal-led-delhi-government-failed-world-boxing-championship-medalist-gaurav-bidhuri-4084378/
 https://www.indiatvnews.com/sports/cricket/wish-ipl-13-to-succeed-it-can-encourage-other-sports-too-boxer-gaurav-bidhuri-643609
 https://www.indiatoday.in/sports/other-sports/story/gaurav-bidhuri-sports-ministry-olympic-qualifiers-exclusion-1631734-2019-12-26
 https://timesofindia.indiatimes.com/sports/latest-videos/indian-boxer-gaurav-bidhuri-trying-his-hand-at-cutting-hair/videoshow/75164786.cms
 https://www.newsnationtv.com/sports/indian-premier-league/ipl-13-news-gaurav-bidhuri-about-true-feelings-on-indian-premier-league-154990.html
 https://www.indiatoday.in/sports/other-sports/story/amit-panghal-gaurav-bidhuri-nomiated-arjuna-award-1513668-2019-04-30
 https://indianexpress.com/article/sports/sport-others/india-boxing-tokyo-olympics-qualifiers-cancelled-7191503/
 https://thebridge.in/boxing/boxer-gaurav-bidhuri-questions-exclusion-olympic-qualifiers-trial
 https://www.outlookindia.com/website/story/sports-news-presidents-cup-boxing-indias-gaurav-bidhuri-enters-semis/334869
 https://timesofindia.indiatimes.com/sports/boxing/world-boxing-championship-gaurav-bidhuri-settles-for-bronze/articleshow/60314380.cms
 https://indianexpress.com/article/sports/sport-others/gaurav-bidhuri-secures-worlds-medal-makes-fathers-dream-come-true-4819960/
 https://www.thestatesman.com/sports/mary-kom-gaurav-bidhuri-reach-indonesia-presidents-cup-final-1502783086.html
 https://timesofindia.indiatimes.com/sports/boxing/national-boxing-championships-gaurav-bidhuri-manish-kaushik-storm-into-finals/articleshow/66465557.cms
 https://www.insidesport.co/boxing-promotor-ios-sports-signs-5-world-championship-medallist/
 https://www.amarujala.com/sports/other-sports/gaurav-bidhuri-assures-medal-for-india-in-world-boxing-championship
 https://www.amarujala.com/sports/other-sports/amit-panghal-and-gaurav-bidhuri-name-consider-for-arjun-award
 https://timesofindia.indiatimes.com/sports/boxing/gaurav-bidhuri-8th-indian-boxer-to-qualify-for-world-championships/articleshow/59634549.cms
 https://www.thehansindia.com/posts/index/Sports/2018-11-03/National-Boxing-Championships-Manish-Kaushik-wins-second-consecutive-gold-Gaurav-Bidhuri-settles-for-Silver/436628
 https://sports.ndtv.com/boxing/boxer-gaurav-bidhuri-happy-to-live-fathers-dream-of-world-championships-1745812

External links
http://timesofindia.indiatimes.com/sports/boxing/world-boxing-championship-gaurav-bidhuri-assures-india-a-medal/articleshow/60279535.cms

Indian male boxers
Living people
1993 births
Martial artists from Delhi
AIBA World Boxing Championships medalists
Boxers at the 2014 Asian Games
Asian Games competitors for India
Bantamweight boxers